Deluge Mountain is a mountain summit located in British Columbia, Canada.

Description
Deluge Mountain is a 2,789-meter-elevation (9,150-foot) peak situated 20 kilometers (12.4 miles) northwest of The Bugaboos, in the Purcell Mountains which are a subrange of the Columbia Mountains. Precipitation runoff from Deluge Mountain's southwest slope drains to the Duncan River, and from all other slopes into Crystalline Creek and eventually the Spillimacheen River. Topographic relief is significant as the summit rises 1,200 meters (3,940 feet) above the Crystalline valley in two kilometers (1.24 mile).

Etymology
The mountain's name was submitted for official consideration in 1955 by mountaineer Peter Robinson (1932–2019). The landform was presumably named in 1954 by Robinson, who climbed in the area that year when his climbing party became drenched and cold while camped across the valley from this mountain. Sometimes the peak can be seen from Crystalline valley during a rain storm, with its summit shrouded in clouds and a waterfall pouring from its north slope. A deluge is a large downpour of rain, often a flood. The mountain's toponym was officially adopted June 9, 1960, by the Geographical Names Board of Canada.

Climate

Based on the Köppen climate classification, Deluge Mountain is located in a subarctic climate zone with cold, snowy winters, and mild summers. Temperatures in winter can drop below −20 °C with wind chill factors below −30 °C. This climate supports unnamed glaciers on the mountain's slopes.

See also
 Geography of British Columbia
 Purcell Supergroup

References

External links
 Deluge Mountain: weather forecast

Purcell Mountains
Two-thousanders of British Columbia
Kootenay Land District